= Passport to Romance =

Studio album by Percy Faith & His Orchestra
- Released: 1956
- Genre: Easy listening
- Label: Columbia

Passport to Romance is a 1956 album of orchestral pop instrumentals by Percy Faith & His Orchestra. It was released in 1956 by Columbia Records. The album contains 12 songs built around a theme of travel in Europe.

It debuted on the pop album chart on July 28, 1956, peaked at the No. 18 spot, and remained on the chart for two weeks. AllMusic gave the album a rating of four stars. Reviewer Greg Adams wrote: "Faith's orchestrations are cheerful and varied, evoking sunny days and happy times . . . Faith's fresh and exciting arrangements make Passport to Romance a virtual vacation in music."

== Track listing ==
Side A

1. "Madeira"
2. "Merry-Go-Round"
3. "Bonjour Tristesse"
4. "Moritat"
5. "Heart Of Paris"
6. "Bread, Love And Dreams"

Side B

1. "Little Bells And Big Bells"
2. "The Little Lost Dog"
3. "Scalinatella"
4. "Portuguese Washerwoman"
5. "Sierra Madre"
6. "Sombra"
